Koutalas is a rural village and a community in southern Corinthia, Greece. It is part of the municipal unit of Tenea. In 2011 its population was 215 for the village, and 746 for the community. The community consists of the villages Koutalas, Mapsos (pop. 174) and Spathovouni (pop. 357). Koutalas is situated on a hillside, 3 km northwest of Chiliomodi, 5 km northeast of Agios Vasileios and 14 km southwest of Corinth. Koutalas suffered damage from the 2007 Greek forest fires.

External links
 Koutalas GTP Travel Pages

See also

List of settlements in Corinthia

References

Populated places in Corinthia